Svetoslav Ivanov (born 16 December 1951) is a Bulgarian equestrian. He competed in two events at the 1980 Summer Olympics, winning a silver medal in the team dressage event.

References

External links
 

1951 births
Living people
Bulgarian male equestrians
Bulgarian dressage riders
Olympic equestrians of Bulgaria
Equestrians at the 1980 Summer Olympics
Place of birth missing (living people)
Olympic silver medalists for Bulgaria
Olympic medalists in equestrian
Medalists at the 1980 Summer Olympics
20th-century Bulgarian people